The city of Birmingham, in England, is an important manufacturing and engineering centre, employing over 100,000 people in the industry and contributing billions of pounds to the national economy. During 2013, the West Midlands region as a whole created UK exports in goods worth £19.6 billion, around 8.73% of the national total, however, exports fell by 14.5% compared to 2012 and there is a trade deficit of £5.6 billion. Output was forecast to grow from 2007 to 2012, but the city's economy flat-lined in from 2007 to 2009, following the economic crisis which affected the economies of countries around the world.

Birmingham was second only to London for the creation of new jobs between 1951 and 1961, and unemployment rarely exceeded 1% between 1948 and 1966. By 1961, household incomes in the West Midlands (county) were 13% above the national average, exceeding even London and the South East. However, the incoming Labour government of 1964 sought to control what it saw as a "threatening situation", most notably by extending the Control of Office Employment Act 1965, to the Birmingham conurbation in 1965. Birmingham's economic landscape had suffered significantly as a result, but since then much of the damage has been undone. The economy of Birmingham also grew relatively slowly between 2002 and 2012, where growth was 31% vs national growth of 44%: the lowest of all the Core Cities. Many of the higher skilled jobs generated have gone to commuters from the surrounding area, and the two parliamentary constituencies with the highest unemployment rates in the UK – Ladywood and Sparkbrook and Small Heath – are both in inner-city Birmingham. According to the 2010 Indices of Multiple Deprivation, Birmingham is the most deprived local authority in England in terms of income and employment. Overall, Birmingham is the 9th most deprived local authority in England when factors such as crime, health and education are included, behind Liverpool and Manchester as the third most deprived Core City. Growth has also placed significant strain on the city's transport infrastructure, with many major roads and the central New Street railway station operating considerably over capacity during peak periods.

Birmingham was also one of the founding cities for the Eurocities group and is also sitting as chair. Birmingham is considered to be a 'Beta-' global city, rated as the joint second most globally influential city in the UK after London. Birmingham has the second largest city economy in the UK after London and was ranked 72nd in the world in 2008.

Economic indices
Below is a collection of economic indices featuring Birmingham. It is important to remember that while useful, surveys and indicators have limitations, and are at times subjective and incomplete. For example, no complete list of factors affecting the quality of life can be created, and the way people weigh these factors differs.

Quality of life
10th in the UK for quality of life (2013), according to a rating of the UK's 1st largest cities, ahead of Sheffield and Bradford who rank 11th and 12th respectively. The cities were assessed on a range of factors including property market activity, rental costs, salary levels, disposable income growth, cost of living, unemployment rates and life satisfaction.
52nd-most liveable city in the world in 2010, according to the Mercer Index of worldwide standards of living,
19th in the UK amongst big cities for 'cycle-friendliness' (2010).
Overall 9th most deprived Local Authority in England according to the 2010 Indices of Deprivation, which takes into account: income; employment; health and disability; education, skills and training; barriers to housing and services; crime; and living environment.
Most deprived Local Authority in England in terms of income deprivation.
Most deprived Local Authority in England in terms of employment deprivation.

Business
Cushman & Wakefield European Cities Monitor (2010) – A survey based on the views of 500 European businesses of Europe's leading business cities.
Overall 18th in Europe, 3rd in the UK after London and Manchester, best city to locate a business based on factors which are disaggregated below.
9th in Europe, 2nd in the UK after London, for ease of access to markets, customers or clients.
16th in Europe, 3rd in the UK after London and Manchester, for best-qualified staff.
15th in Europe, 3rd in the UK after London and Manchester, for quality of telecommunications.
11th in Europe, 3rd in the UK after London and Manchester, for external transport links to other cities and internationally.
5th in Europe, 3rd in the UK after Leeds and Glasgow, in terms of value for money of office space.
15th in Europe, 4th in the UK after Glasgow, Leeds and Manchester, for the cost of staff.
4th in Europe, 2nd in the UK after Manchester, for the availability of office space.
16th in Europe, 4th in the UK after London, Manchester and Glasgow, for climate governments create for businesses.
11th in Europe, 2nd in the UK after London, in terms of languages spoken.
18th in Europe, 4th in the UK after London, Manchester and Leeds for ease of travelling around within the city.

In the same survey, when asked how well companies know each of the cities as a business location, 28% said they were familiar with Birmingham as a business location. This was the third-highest in the UK after London (82%) and Manchester (33%).

GVA

In 2013, Birmingham's GVA was £24.1bn, accounting for 21.8% of the GVA of the West Midlands (region), and 1.6% of the GVA of the UK. Compared with other NUTS 3 city areas, its GVA is exceeded only by London (comprising five NUTS 3 areas – £309.3bn) and Greater Manchester South (£34.8bn).

The increase in GVA in 2013 was particularly strong when compared to previous years (increase in GVA of 2.2% in the period 2011–2012 for Birmingham).

Productivity
GVA per employee in Birmingham is estimated to be £42,800 in 2012. It is ranked 6th among the major cities and conurbations in the UK, and ranked 3rd among the Core Cities behind London (£75,100), Edinburgh (£54,100), Leeds (£46,900), Greater Manchester South (£46,500) and Glasgow (£44,700).

excluding Birmingham, included Bristol, Leeds, Liverpool, Manchester, Newcastle, Nottingham and Sheffield

GVA by sector

GDP

According to the 2012 Eurostat figures, GDP per capita (in euros) of Greater Manchester is = €27,500 just ahead of the West-Midlands with €26,600 but only half the GDP per capita of Dublin €57,200 or London with €54,200.

Greater Manchester has a total GDP of €74.398 bn, West Midlands has a total GDP of €73.538 bn but less than the €85.700 bn in Greater Dublin and €450.379 bn in Greater London.

Employment, welfare and education
The mid-year estimate for the population of Birmingham was 1,085,400 in 2012 and population growth was estimated to be 1.04%, the 4th highest of the Core Cities after Nottingham (1.59%), Manchester (1.56%) and Newcastle (1.2%).

Employment

Earnings

Median earnings in pounds for employees living in Birmingham

Median earnings in pounds for employees working in Birmingham.

Education

Business activity
As the UK economy continues to recover from the downturn experienced in 2008–10, Birmingham has underperformed relative to other Core Cities, where a change in business stock was 1.6% compared to 3.6% for the Core Cities average. However, the underlying data showed that Birmingham had a high entrepreneurial activity with high levels of business start-ups, but this was offset by a relatively high number of business deaths.

excluding Birmingham, included Bristol, Leeds, Liverpool, Manchester, Newcastle, Nottingham and Sheffield

Jewellery Quarter

The Jewellery Quarter is the largest concentration of dedicated jewellers in Europe.  One-third of the jewellery manufactured in the UK is made within one mile of Birmingham city centre. Until 2003, coins for circulation were manufactured in the Jewellery Quarter at the Birmingham Mint, the oldest independent mint in the world, which continues to produce commemorative coins and medals.

From manufacturing to service and research

As with most of the British economy, manufacturing in Birmingham has declined in importance since the 1970s, and it now employs a minority of the workforce. In recent years Birmingham's economy has diversified into service industries, retailing and tourism, which are now the main employers in the city.  There are problems when labour skills do not match available job vacancies.  Jobs in the service and tourist sectors are estimated to rise by 50,000 over the next ten years.

Today the city's products include: motor vehicles, vehicle components and accessories, weapons, electrical equipment, plastics, machine tools, chemicals, food, jewellery and glass.  Birmingham is home to two major car factories, MG Rover in Longbridge and Jaguar in Castle Bromwich (and Land Rovers are manufactured in neighbouring Solihull). There are also other factories like at Autodesk that are important as smaller factories.

Retail

Birmingham is home to one of the largest shopping centres in the UK, the Bullring.  It is also the busiest in the UK, attracting 36.5 million visitors in its first year. Birmingham is the most visited retail destination outside London and the retail sector makes up a large proportion of the city's economy.

The city centre currently has three major shopping centres: The Bullring, The Mailbox, Grand Central and the Fort in Castle Vale as well as several smaller arcades and precincts and four department stores: Selfridges, Debenhams, House of Fraser and Harvey Nichols; with John Lewis opening its biggest store outside London in the city's New Street station development in 2015.

The city's designer and high-end fashion stores are mostly situated in the upmarket Mailbox shopping centre, around the Colmore Row financial district, although the Bullring has seen an influx of designer brands such as Hugo Boss, Thomas Sabo, Radley and Armani Exchange.

The city centre also has four markets: The Bullring indoor market, The Birmingham rag market, St Martins outdoor market and the Oasis clothes market.

Tourism
With major facilities such as the International Convention Centre, the National Exhibition Centre and the Symphony Hall the Birmingham area accounts for 42% of the UK conference and exhibition trade. The city's sporting and cultural venues attract large numbers of visitors, including the library of Birmingham, which is the largest public library in Europe. Birmingham is the 4th most visited city in the UK.

Research at Birmingham
Research at the University of Birmingham, both theoretical and practical has contributed to the success of the city and the West Midlands region and had a worldwide impact for more than a century. Now the university ranks as high as 10th in the UK according to the QS World University Rankings. Scientific research including research into the controversial nano technology at the University of Birmingham, is expanding in the city and will possibly play a part in the city's economic future.

Banking, insurance and law

In 2011, Birmingham's financial and insurance services industry was worth £2.46 billion, the 4th largest in the United Kingdom after London, Edinburgh and Manchester. The city also had the fourth largest number of employees in the financial and insurance sector after London, Leeds and Glasgow, with more than 111,500 people employed in banking, finance and insurance, translating to 23% of all employees.

Birmingham has the two largest sets of barrister's chambers in the country; a local law society; 50 major property firms and one of Europe's largest insurance markets. Two of the UK's largest professional service organisations, PwC and Ernst & Young, have established centres in Birmingham's central business district.

The city attracts over 40% of the UK's total conference trade. Two of Britain's "big four" banks were founded in Birmingham: Lloyds Bank (now Lloyds Banking Group) was established in the city in 1765 and The Midland Bank (now HSBC Bank plc) opened in Union Street, in August 1836.

Renewable resources
Birmingham has a large incineration plant, the Tyseley Energy from Waste Plant which produces electricity for the National Grid through the process of burning waste. It was built in 1996 by Veolia.

Famous brands
Famous brands from the "city of a thousand trades" include Bird's Custard, Typhoo Tea, the Birmingham Wire Gauge, Brylcreem, Chad Valley Toys, BSA, Bakelite, Cadburys chocolate, HP Sauce, The Elite Performance Sports Company (Epic) and the MG Rover Group; although no Rover cars are set to be produced in the future, with Nanjing Automobile Group to focus on the MG cars.

See also

Economic history of Birmingham

References

Works cited

External links
Birmingham City Council site on the economy of the city